Lakeview Airport  is a public-use airport located one mile (1.6 km) east of the central business district (CBD) of Lake Dallas, in Denton County, Texas, United States.

The airport is closed to transient student traffic and touch-and-go's are not permitted.  No fuel service is available.

Landing on the paved runway is not currently recommended due to its poor condition.

References

External links 

Airports in Texas
Airports in the Dallas–Fort Worth metroplex
Transportation in Denton County, Texas
Buildings and structures in Denton County, Texas